Wahlenbergia queenslandica is a small herbaceous plant in the family Campanulaceae native to Western Australia, to New South Wales, Queensland, the Northern Territory, and South Australia.

It blooms between April and September producing blue-purple flowers in WA. However, in the Northern Territory it flowers from February through to December and fruits from February to November, while in NSW it flowers throughout the year.

It is similar to W. communis: both have large corollas with long lobes, however W. communis differs in having a strictly alternate leaf arrangement, long hairs on the inner surface of the corolla tube near the base, and obconical (and frequently more elongated) fruit.

The species is found on the edges of swamps and creek beds and damp flats in the Kimberley region of Western Australia where it grows in sandy-loam soils. In the Territory it is found on mulga-dominated plains, alluvial plains and intermittent watercourses.

References

External links
Wahlenbergia queenslandica: Occurrence data from the Australasian Virtual Herbarium

queenslandica
Eudicots of Western Australia
Plants described in 1986
Flora of South Australia
Flora of New South Wales
Flora of Queensland
Flora of the Northern Territory